Hazelhurst is an unincorporated community in Carroll and Ogle counties, Illinois, United States. Hazelhurst is located along a railroad line east of Milledgeville.

References

Unincorporated communities in Carroll County, Illinois
Unincorporated communities in Ogle County, Illinois
Unincorporated communities in Illinois